Otiorhynchini is a true weevil tribe in the subfamily Entiminae.

Genera 
Agronus - Calyptops - Catergus - Cirrorhynchus - Dodecastichus - Epitimetes - Homodus - Hygrochus - Kocheriana - Lepydnus - Limatogaster - Meiranella - Neotournieria - Otiorhynchus - Parameira - Parotiorhynchus - Pavesiella - Phaeocharis - Pseudocratopus - Rhynchotious - Sciobius - Sciopithes - Tylotus - †Otiorhynchites - †Otiorrhynchites

References 

 Schönherr, C.J. 1826: Curculionidum dispositio methodica cum generum characteribus, descriptionibus atque observationibus variis seu Prodromus ad Synonymiae Insectorum, partem IV. Fleischer, Lipsiae: X + 338 
 Alonso-Zarazaga, M.A.; Lyal, C.H.C. 1999: A world catalogue of families and genera of Curculionoidea (Insecta: Coleoptera) (excepting Scolytidae and Platypodidae). Entomopraxis, Barcelona. [see p. 167, as valid tribus]

External links 

 bugguide.net

Entiminae